Christian Müller (August 11, 1921 in Münsingen – March 29, 2013 in Bern) was a teacher, psychiatrist, psychoanalyst and Swiss writer from the canton de Vaud.

See also 
 Enquête de Lausanne

External links
Christian Müller Biography

Schizophrenia researchers
Swiss psychiatrists
1921 births
2013 deaths
People from Münsingen